Mohd Hafidz Romly (born 20 September 1989) is a Malaysian footballer who plays for Langkawi City as a goalkeeper.

Club career

T–Team
On February 11, 2017 Hafidz made his debut for the club playing against Melaka United during league match.

Career statistics

References

External links
 

1989 births
Living people
Malaysian footballers
Terengganu FC players
Terengganu F.C. II players
People from Perlis
Association football goalkeepers